Condor (possibly from Quechua for condor) is a mountain in the Andes of Peru, about  high. It is located in the Arequipa Region, Caylloma Province, Choco District. It lies in the Chila mountain range north of the Colca River. Condor is situated at the Umaranra valley. Its stream flows to the Collpamayo (possibly from Quechua for "salpeter river") whose waters feed the Colca River.

References 

Mountains of Peru
Mountains of Arequipa Region